These are the results of the diving competition at the 2003 World Aquatics Championships, which took place in Barcelona, Spain.

Medal table

Medal summary

Men

Women

Diving competitions
Diving at the World Aquatics Championships
2003 in diving